Ruben Néstor Soria (born 23 January 1935) is a Uruguayan football defender who played for Uruguay in the 1962 FIFA World Cup. He also played for C.A. Cerro.

References

External links
 

1935 births
Uruguayan footballers
Uruguay international footballers
Association football defenders
C.A. Cerro players
1962 FIFA World Cup players
Living people